Vampire plants might refer to:

 Parasitic plants, which suck nutrients from their hosts
 Vampire pumpkins and watermelons, a folk legend about plants that turn into vampires